Rolf Roosalu, also known as Rolf Junior (born 18 January 1982 in Tartu), is an Estonian singer who has participated in a number of musicals. He has also, yet unsuccessfully, competed to represent Estonia at the Eurovision Song Contest six times (2008–13), with him most recently competing at Eesti Laul 2018. In 2010, when the contest was held in Oslo, he announced the Estonian televoting results to the other countries. In 2013, he did the same when the contest was held in Malmö.

Musical work

2007 
Les Misérables

2006 
 Fame
 Amberstar
 Tuhkatriinu
 Cats, Andrew Lloyd Webber musical
 West Side Story

2004 
 Starlight Cabaret,
 Vampiiride Tants
 Öölaps

2003 
 Kaks takti ette
 The Caribbean Moods
 Miss Saigon
 The Greatest Love Stories
 Summertime
 Estvocal
 Euro Hit

2002 
 Raimond Valgre Festival
 Fizz Superstar (TV talent show)
 Laulatus

1998 
 Pokumäng

1995 
 Don Quixote
 Kaval-Ants ja Vanapagan

1993 
 Oliver!

References 

1982 births
Living people
Musicians from Tartu
21st-century Estonian male singers
20th-century Estonian male singers
Estonian pop singers
Estonian male musical theatre actors
20th-century Estonian male actors
Eesti Laul contestants